The 1967–68 NCAA University Division men's basketball season began in December 1967, progressed through the regular season and conference tournaments, and concluded with the 1968 NCAA University Division basketball tournament championship game on March 23, 1968, at Los Angeles Memorial Sports Arena in Los Angeles, California. The UCLA Bruins won their fourth NCAA national championship with a 78–55 victory over the North Carolina Tar Heels.

Rule changes 
The slam dunk — criticized as a move that rewards height rather than skill — is prohibited in NCAA basketball both during games and during pre-game warm-ups. It will not become legal again until the 1976–77 season.

Season headlines 

 UCLA won its second NCAA championship in a row, fourth overall, and fourth in five seasons. In the Athletic Association of Western Universities, it also won its second of what ultimately would be 13 consecutive conference titles.
 The National Invitation Tournament expanded from 14 to 16 teams.

Season outlook

Pre-season polls 

The Top 10 from the AP Poll and Top 20 from the Coaches Poll during the pre-season.

Conference membership changes

Regular season

Conference winners and tournaments

Informal championships

Statistical leaders

Post-season tournaments

NCAA tournament

Final Four 

 Third Place – Ohio State 89, Houston 85

National Invitation tournament

Semifinals & finals 

 Third Place – Notre Dame 81, St. Peter's 78

Awards

Consensus All-American teams

Major player of the year awards 

 Helms Player of the Year: Lew Alcindor, UCLA
 Associated Press Player of the Year: Elvin Hayes, Houston
 UPI Player of the Year: Elvin Hayes, Houston
 Oscar Robertson Trophy (USBWA): Lew Alcindor, UCLA
 Sporting News Player of the Year: Elvin Hayes, Houston

Major coach of the year awards 

 Associated Press Coach of the Year: Guy Lewis, Houston
 Henry Iba Award (USBWA): Guy Lewis, Houston
 NABC Coach of the Year: Guy Lewis, Houston
 UPI Coach of the Year: Guy Lewis, Houston
 Sporting News Coach of the Year: Guy Lewis, Houston

Other major awards 

 Robert V. Geasey Trophy (Top player in Philadelphia Big 5): Johnny Jones, Villanova
 NIT/Haggerty Award (Top player in New York City metro area): Jim McMillian, Columbia

Coaching changes 

A number of teams changed coaches throughout the season and after the season ended.

References